Antilles Records was a record label founded as a division of Island Records. It began as a jazz label, recording Joanne Brackeen, Biréli Lagrène, and Phil Woods, though its catalogue did expand to include eclectic musicians like Brian Eno and Robert Fripp. It was the first to introduce the Slits and Nick Drake to American audiences. One of its founders was Jeff Walker, an employee at Island and the first A&R director for Antilles.

In the 1990s, Antilles recorded Peter Apfelbaum, Johnny Griffin, Frank Morgan, Steve Turre, and Randy Weston. Polygram bought Island, Seagram's bought Polygram, and by the end of the decade Antilles stopped recording jazz.

Discography
1001: Joanne Brackeen – Special Identity (1981)
1002: Biréli Lagrène – Routes to Django (1980)
1003: Heath Brothers – Brotherly Love (1981)
1004: Ben Sidran – Old Songs for the New Depression (1981)
1005: Anthony Braxton – Six Compositions: Quartet (1981)
1006: Phil Woods – Birds of a Feather (1981)
1007: Air – 80° Below '82 (1982)
1008: Ronald Shannon Jackson and the Decoding Society – Mandance (1982)
1009: Biréli Lagrène – 15 (1982)
1010: Gil Evans – Priestess (recorded 1977 [1983])
1011: Zahara – Flight of the Spirit (1983)
1012: Ben Sidran – Bop City (1983)
1013: Phil Woods – Phil Woods at the Vanguard (1982)
1014: Swingrass '83 – Swingrass '83 (1982)
1015: Ronald Shannon Jackson – Barbeque Dog (1983)
1016: Heath Brothers – Brothers and Others (1983)
1017: Elements – Elements (1982)
1018: Steve Khan – Eyewitness (1981)
1019: Biréli Lagrène – Down in Town
1020: Steve Khan – Casa Loco (1983)
1021: Elements – Forward Motion (1983)
2001: Ornette Coleman – Of Human Feelings (1979)
7001: Fripp & Eno – (No Pussyfooting) (1976, 1st issue 1973 on Island)
7005: Third World (Steve Winwood & Remi Kabaka) – Aiye – Keta 1973)
7010: Nick Drake – Five Leaves Left (1976, 1st issue 1969 on Island)
7011: White Noise – An Electric Storm (1973, 1st issue 1969 on Island)
7023: Tim Hardin – Nine (1976)
7027: Albion Country Band – Battle of the Field (1976)
7028: Nick Drake – Bryter Layter (1976, 1st issue 1971 on Island)
7029: Gay and Terry Woods – The Time Is Right (1976)
7034: Don Cherry – Eternal Now (1973)
7035: Johnny Dyani, Okay Temiz, Mongezi Feza – Music for Xaba (1972)
7067: Various Artists – No New York (1978)
8701: Naná Vasconcelos – Bush Dance (1986)
8706: Jim Pepper – Comin' and Goin' (1987)
8722: Laszlo Gardony – The Secret (1988)
87449: Laszlo Gardony – The Legend of Tsumi (1989)

References

American record labels
Jazz record labels